The 1930 Greyhound Derby took place during June with the final being held on 28 June 1930 at White City Stadium. The winner Mick the Miller received a first prize of £1,480.

Final result 
At White City (over 525 yards):

Distances 
3, 3¼, head, 2, 2 (lengths)
The distances between the greyhounds are in finishing order and shown in lengths. From 1927-1950 one length was equal to 0.06 of one second but race times are shown as 0.08 as per modern day calculations.

Review
The first round got underway on Saturday 7 June and Mick the Miller won his first round at odds of 100-8 on, defeating the field in his heat by 15 lengths in a time of 30.14. The Manchester hope O'Brazil claimed victory, as did another greyhound called Deemster who won a heat in a faster time than Mick the Miller (29.90). Mick the Miller's brother Macoma also won a heat.

During the second round Mick the Milelr was a little disappointing only claiming victory by one and a half lengths from the 1929 Irish Greyhound Derby winner Jack Bob in 30.59. Deemster, although strong favourite for his second round heat, sadly broke a hock and his anticipated challenge to Mick the Miller was over. Macoma also failed to progress any further.

Jack Bob claimed his semi-final and Mick the Miller won his, despite a serious challenge all the way round from Dresden and the 1928 unofficial Irish Greyhound Derby champion Tipperary Hills. The third semi-final was won by Mick McGee.

Mick the Miller was made the 9/4 on favourite in the final despite a line-up that included Jack Bob and leading bitch called Bradshaw Fold, who held the world record for 550 and 700 yards. Also featuring was So Green, the Puppy Derby and Trafalgar Cup champion. A derby roar by an attendance in excess of 50,000 took place as the hare was in motion, the roar would become a traditional feature of future events. Mick the Miller using the advantage of the red jacket (trap one), led early and won comfortably by three lengths. He had sealed his place in history by achieving a second Derby win and became known as the 'Worlds Wonder Dog'. His name remains famous today.

See also
1930 UK & Ireland Greyhound Racing Year

References

Greyhound Derby
English Greyhound Derby
Greyhound racing in London
English Greyhound Derby
English Greyhound Derby